The NICO Clean Tobacco Card was a device exported from Japan to the United States in the 1960s, consisting of a small card impregnated with uranium ore.  The card was to be placed inside a pack of cigarettes, and the producers claimed that the radiation emitted by the card would reduce tar and nicotine, and enhance the smoking experience.

A similar product, the Nicotine Alkaloid Control Plate, was produced in the 1990s but not exported.

References

 

Cigarettes
Radioactive quackery
Smoking in Japan